Ray Mutimer is a British illustrator.

Ray Ivan Gerald Mutimer was born in 1937.  His parents, Olive and Aubrey, and  an older sister, Janet, lived in the village of Gorefield, near Wisbech "Capital of the Fens" of East Anglia. He was educated at Gorefield village school and passed his 11+ to Wisbech Boys Grammar School.  His artistic skills and enthusiasm were encouraged, not by the school, but by Bill Wright, who had a signwriting business, and an Art Materials and Photography shop in Wisbech.  Ray was proficient in drawing, watercolour and oil painting at the age of 15.   Thanks to Bill Wright who was his mentor at that time.  Unaware of such a thing as an Art School, Ray applied for a 2 Year Teacher Training Course at Trent Park Teacher Training College, Barnet. The college specialised in Music, Art and Drama.

He first had to do his National Service with the Suffolk Regiment from 1955 to 1975.  He joined the Intelligence Section, served in Germany and on active service in Cyprus.  Reached the rank of Corporal - unusual for national service personnel.

Early career 
At college he met his future wife, Christine Spence.   He moved to Yorkshire, her home county.  After gaining experience in a Leeds school and Christchurch Boys School Harrogate, he eventually became Head of Art and Craft at St Aidan's C.E. High School in Harrogate. Whilst teaching, he continued his own personal paintings and exhibited widely in the North of England during the sixties and seventies. He had two paintings in the Contemporary British Watercolours Exhibition at the Royal Watercolour Society Galleries. He went on to have thirty one-man shows. He was also selected for many annual regional group exhibitions such as the West Riding Artists' Exhibition (Wakefield), Modern Art in Yorkshire (9 artists) and Yorkshire Artists exhibitions.

His first illustrations were cartoon drawings, about teaching, which were regularly published in the Times Educational Supplement and Teacher's World.

He became interested in children's book illustration, and after overcoming a series of rejections, Yorkshire Television used his artwork in the national T.V. school and pre-school programmes My World and Stepping Stones. His illustrations for traditional and new stories, including some of his own, were shown on the programmes for four years.

Illustration 
In 1980, he became a freelance illustrator.

Working with Michael Benn Publishing, Ray originated and published educational material for industry.  One of its successes was time charts which took the form of a 4-part frieze showing the history of an industry or institution. Each had about 50 pictures blended into a montage. Ray illustrated history Time Charts for The Inland Revenue, The Banking Information Service, The Royal Mint, Pilkington Glass (history of windows), Thames Water and The Atomic Energy Authority. He also designed and illustrated fourteen A1 and A2 posters for similar institutions, including The Royal Society of Arts.

Books 
Postman Pat is a TV character created by Ivor Wood and writer John Cunliffe.  In 1989 Ray started his first series of 12 Postman Pat picture books called "Tales from Greendale", published by Andre Deutsch Children's Books and Scholastic. These were followed by four books based on new TV episodes. He also did associated activity and sticker books.
 
For Egmont Publishing he did a number of Postman Pat board books for younger children drawn in a simple heavy black line style and computer coloured. Ray drew eight Postman Pat Annuals from 1993 to 2000.

Between 1997 and 2005, Ray worked on educational books for Africa and the Caribbean for Macmillan Education.
Covering an enormous range of subjects in 24 books. Some were illustrations for a traditional African story, some were factual, some descriptive, religious, decorative, some picture stories, some comic, some pure adventure.

He brought his individual slant to classic rhymes and fairy stories in The Award book of Tales and Rhymes, published by Award Publications in 1999.

Magazines and comics 
From 1982 to 1988, Mutimer wrote, designed and illustrated pages of craft "how to make" activities for children. These appeared in various comics, mostly for girls. The longest running was "Make with Mum" in Pepper Street, published by DC Thomson.

For four years, he drew another TV character created by Ivor Wood, Charlie Chalk. He drew 2 or 3 pictures strips and the occasional activity page each week in the Postman Pat Weekly Children's magazine published by Fleetway.
Towards the end of the comic's life he also drew Postman Pat on the covers and inside.  He gave the fortnightly "Play and Learn Postman Pat" spin off striking fully painted covers as well as interior picture strips.

Working for Marvel UK from 1992 to 1994, on Rupert and friends and Rupert Learn and Play – weekly children's picture strip magazines, Ray illustrated four page picture stories and activity pages called Bingo's Workshop.

Ray also contributed to various BBC Publications Children's magazines.

Children's Magazines in which work regularly appeared

Later exhibitions 

August 2004. "Original Postman Pat illustrations." Newby Hall, Ripon. 65 pictures.

May 2005. Heild Gallery, Bishop Monkton.

August 2005. "Original Postman Pat illustrations." Newby Hall, Ripon. 63 pictures.

August 2006. "Original Postman Pat illustrations." Newby Hall, Ripon. 62 pictures.

September 2006. “Great North Art Show.” (Group Show.) Ripon Cathedral, Ripon. 4 paintings.

August 2007. "Original Postman Pat illustrations." Newby Hall, Ripon. 71 pictures.

September 2007. “Great North Art Show.” (Group Show.) Ripon Cathedral, Ripon. 4 paintings.

December 2007. “Postman Pat illustrations.” Preston Hall Museum, Stockton-on-Tees. (Raising funds for the Butterwick Hospice Extension Appeal.)

August 2008. "Original Postman Pat illustrations."  Newby Hall, Ripon. 65 pictures.

September 2008. “Great North Art Show.” (Group Show.) Ripon Cathedral, Ripon. 4 paintings.

September 2009. “Great North Art Show.” (Group Show.) Ripon Cathedral, Ripon. 4 paintings.

August 2011. The March Hare Gallery, Ripon.

December 2011. “A Little Imagination.” Art in the Mill, Knaresborough.

July & August 2012. “Postman Pat and others” Nunnington Hall, York.

July, August & September 2013. Assorted illustrations at Beningbrough Hall. Yorkshire.

March 2015. Tennant's Garden gallery, Harrogate.

April 2015. St Michaels Hospice, Harrogate. (Solo fund raising show.)

June 2015. Mercer Gallery, Harrogate. 1 painting, 1 drawing.

April, May & June 2016. Preston Hall Museum, Stockton-on-Tees. 28 paintings and 28 illustrations.

Bibliography (partial)

References

External links
 http://www.yorkshirepost.co.uk/art/Postman-Pat-and-the-look.3011486.jp
 http://yorkshire.greatbritishlife.co.uk/article/knaresborough-illustrator-ray-mutimer-opens-up-3839/

English illustrators
Living people
Year of birth missing (living people)